Luksika Kumkhum and Prarthana Thombare were the defending champions, but Kumkhum chose not to participate. Thombare partnered alongside Tereza Smitková, but lost in the first round to Quinn Gleason and Ingrid Neel.

Duan Yingying and Zhu Lin won the title, defeating Robin Anderson and Laura Ioana Paar in the final, 6–4, 6–3.

Seeds

Draw

Draw

References
Main Draw

Manchester Trophy - Doubles